Paul Anthony Ashworth (born 29 September 1969) is an English football manager and former player.

Ashworth had previously played at youth level for Norwich City before setting up PASS Soccer Schools, a national company. He later worked for Cambridge United and Peterborough United before moving to Latvia where he managed FK Ventspils, FK Riga and Skonto Riga as well as taking over at Russian side FC Rostov as Sporting Director. He worked as a technical director in Nigeria from May 2010 – 2014. 

He was manager/technical director at Sunshine Stars Football Club, a Nigerian premier league team for 6 months before moving back to FK Ventspils as head coach (manager).

Playing career
Paul came through the youth system at Norwich City where he played for the side at schoolboy level. He didn't make the step up to the first team though but began to coach the youth teams at the club.

Youth coaching career

Soccer Schools
While Ashworth was at Carrow Road, he set up his own company, PASS Soccer Schools.

Cambridge United
In 1992, Cambridge United offered Ashworth a role as youth development officer at the club's Abbey Stadium.

Managerial career

Ventspils
In a league dominated by multi-championship winning side Skonto Riga, Ashworth secured two consecutive runners-up finishes, a Latvian Cup triumph and steered his squad into the UEFA Cup for the first time. In subsequent seasons, they also played Finnish side HJK Helsinki, Swiss outfit AC Lugano (winning their first European match)

Rostov
Having previously been unsuccessfully interviewed for the vacant managers position at Russian Premier League club FC Rostov, Ashworth was approached by the president of the club offering him the position of Sporting Director. He accepted the role and was responsible for all of the football side of the club such as youth policy, transfer policy, dealing with visas and international players, research and building of new training facilities as well as liaison with the manager on first team matters. After taking charge temporarily for two matches, he became the first Englishman ever to coach in the Russian Premier League.

Skonto FC
It was during this period that he self titled himself as "The Mourinho of Latvia" simply due to not being good enough to play professionally in senior football

Kwara Football Academy
In 2009 Ashworth moved to the position of technical director of Nigeria's only residential football academy, The Kwara Football Academy. Based in Ilorin, it takes talented youngsters from the ages of 13 to 21 and trains them as professional footballers while allowing them to get educated at the same time. Ashworth now has a staff of nine coaches and more than eighty full-time staff under his tutelage and has developed excellent facilities and training programmes

Astana
On 14 January 2019, FC Astana announced the appointment of Ashworth as their new executive director.
Following the dismissal of manager Michal Bílek on 26 August 2020, Ashworth was appointed acting head-coach of Astana. Ashworth his role as caretaker manager and executive director by mutual consent on 7 October 2020.

Managerial statistics 
As of 27 August 2021

References

External links

1969 births
Living people
People from Aylsham
English footballers
Association footballers not categorized by position
Norwich City F.C. players
Alumni of Newcastle University
English football managers
English expatriate football managers
FK Ventspils managers
Skonto FC managers
FC Rostov managers
FC Astana managers
Expatriate football managers in Latvia
Expatriate football managers in Russia
Expatriate football managers in Nigeria
English expatriate sportspeople in Latvia
English expatriate sportspeople in Russia
English expatriate sportspeople in Nigeria
English expatriate sportspeople in Kazakhstan